Koseze may refer to several places in Slovenia: 

Koseze, Ilirska Bistrica, a settlement in the Municipality of Ilirska Bistrica, southern Slovenia
Koseze, Ljubljana, a neighborhood in Ljubljana, the capital of Slovenia
 Koseze Pond
Koseze, Vodice, a settlement in the Municipality of Vodice, northern Slovenia
Spodnje Koseze, a settlement in the Municipality of Lukovica, northern Slovenia
Zgornje Koseze, a settlement in the Municipality of Moravče, northern Slovenia